Korkhongan (also Romanized as Korkhongān; also known as Garkhonkān, Karkhonkān, Korkhongū, Kurkbunjān, and Kurkhunjān) is a village in Isar Rural District of Isar District of Marvast County, Yazd province, Iran. At the 2006 National Census, its population was 1,500 in 340 households, when it was in Marvast District of Khatam County. The following census in 2011 counted 1,743 people in 424 households. The latest census in 2016 showed a population of 1,488 people in 404 households; it was the largest village in its rural district. Marvast District was raised to county status after the census and divided into the Central District and Isar District, the latter of which appointed Korkhongan as its capital.

References 

Populated places in Yazd Province